Lauvøya is an island in Nærøysund municipality in Trøndelag county, Norway. The island lies along the Nærøysundet, northeast of the island of Inner-Vikna. The island of Gjerdinga (in Nærøy municipality) lies just northeast of Lauvøya.

See also
List of islands of Norway

References

Islands of Trøndelag
Nærøysund
Vikna